Mar Yohannan Yoseph (born 14 November 1966, in Trichur, India) is a bishop of the Chaldean Syrian Church, a metropolitan province of Assyrian Church of the East in India. He was consecrated on 17 January 2010, by Mar Dinkha IV, Patriarch of the Assyrian Church of the East.

Early life 
Mar Yohannan Yoseph was born Joju Anto at East Fort in Trichur on 14 November 1966. He is the seventh of nine children of Therattil Chirakkekaran Antony and Annah (Cicily teacher).

Joju Anto Chaldean arttended Syrian Primary School and Model High School for Boys,Trichur.

He earned his Bachelor of Commerce (B.Com) from Calicut University in 1989.

He studied Theology at Mar Thoma Theological Seminary, Kottayam (1990 - 1994), and earned a Bachelor of Divinity (B.D.) from the University of Serampore.

He stayed at St. Ephrem Ecumenical Research Institute, Kottayam (1998-2000), and earned a Master of Arts (M.A.) in Syriac Language and Literature from Mahatma Gandhi University, Kottayam in 2000. He then traveled to Iraq and stayed there till March, 2003 to continue Syriac studies.

He received his Doctorate (Phd Studies) in Syriac Language and Literature from Mahatma Gandhi University, Kerala in 2017.

Career 
On 16 April 1989 Late Poulose Mar Poulose Episcopa ordained him as Deacon at Mar Adhai Sleeha Church, Paravattani.

On 11 April 1999  Mar Aprem Metropolitan (Aprem Mooken) ordained him as a priest at Mar Yohannan Mamdhana Church, East Fort, Thrissur. From 1996 to 1998 he served as Secretary to Mar Aprem Metropolitan(Aprem Mooken) and Poulose Mar Poulose Episcopa.

He served as the assistant vicar in multiple parishes:
 Mar Narsai Church Kachery
 St. Thomas Church Ernakulam
 Mar Qardagh Sahdha Church Chennai
 Mar Sleeva Church Cochin
 Mart Mariyam Church Koratty 
 Mar Timotheus Church Calicut
 Mar Beesho Church Puthoor, 
 Mar Adhai Sleeha Church Paravattani 
 Mar Oudisho Church Baghdad.

He took the initiative to construct Mar Abdisho Church at Kottayam that later became a Parish while he was vicar. He served as the president of Mar Thoma Ashram (Orphanage for Boys) at Mulayam.

On 17 January 2010 he was consecrated as Episcopa of the Holy Catholic Assyrian Church of the East for the Archdiocese of India by  Mar Dinkha IV.

References

External links
 Church of the East - India

21st-century bishops of the Assyrian Church of the East
Church of the East in India
1966 births
Living people